A State of Trance 2013 is the tenth compilation album in the A State of Trance compilation series mixed and compiled by Dutch DJ and record producer Armin van Buuren. It was released on 14 February 2013 by Armada Music.

Track listing

Charts

References

Armin van Buuren compilation albums
Electronic compilation albums
2013 compilation albums